Christian David Loader (Born 26 October 1973) is a former Welsh rugby union player who played prop. He achieved 19 Wales caps between 1995 and 1997.  Loader played for Pontypridd RFC and Bath Rugby. He retired in 2006.

Notes

Living people
1973 births
Rugby union props
Welsh rugby union players
Wales international rugby union players
Pontypridd RFC players
Bath Rugby players
Bridgend RFC players
Rugby union players from Neath